Karam Bal-e Khodadad (also Romanized as Karam Bal-e Khodādād; also known as Karīm Bāl) is a village in Negur Rural District, Dashtiari District, Chabahar County, Sistan and Baluchestan Province, Iran. At the 2006 census, its population was 270, in 59 families.

References 

Populated places in Chabahar County